In music, Op. 1 stands for Opus number 1. Compositions that are assigned this number include:

 Bach – Partita for keyboard No. 4
 Bartók – Rhapsody
 Beethoven – Piano Trios, Op. 1
 Berg – Piano Sonata
 Brahms – Piano Sonata No. 1
 Chopin – Rondo in C minor
 Clara Schumann – 4 Polonaises
 Clifford – Symphony in E-flat
 Dvořák – String Quintet No. 1 in A minor 
 Elgar – Romance for violin
 Goeyvaerts – Sonata for Two Pianos
 Mendelssohn – Piano Quartet No. 1
 Michael Haydn – Symphony No. 27
 Michael Haydn – Symphony No. 28
 Michael Haydn – Symphony No. 29
 Mozart – Violin Sonata No. 18
 Mozart – Violin Sonata No. 19
 Mozart – Violin Sonata No. 20
 Prokofiev – Piano Sonata No. 1
 Rachmaninoff – Piano Concerto No. 1
 Schubert – Erlkönig
 Schumann – Variations on the name "Abegg"
 Sibelius – Five Christmas songs
 Stamitz – Trios, Op. 1
 Strauss – Sinngedichte
 Strauss – Täuberln-Walzer
 Stravinsky – Symphony in E-flat
 Sullivan – The Tempest
 Tchaikovsky – Scherzo à la russe
 Turina – Piano Quintet
 Vivaldi – Twelve Trio Sonatas, Op. 1
 Waterhouse – String Sextet
 Webern – Passacaglia for orchestra

See also
 OP1 (disambiguation)